The Ludwigslied (in English, Lay or Song of Ludwig) is an Old High German (OHG) poem of 59 rhyming couplets, celebrating the victory of the Frankish army, led by Louis III of France, over Danish (Viking) raiders at the Battle of Saucourt-en-Vimeu on 3 August 881.

The poem is thoroughly Christian in ethos. It presents the Viking raids as a punishment from God: He caused the Northmen to come across the sea to remind the Frankish people of their sins, and inspired Louis to ride to the aid of his people. Louis praises God both before and after the battle.

The poem is preserved in over four pages in a single 9th-century manuscript formerly in the monastery of Saint-Amand, now in the Bibliothèque municipale, Valenciennes (Codex 150, f. 141v-143r). In the same manuscript, and written by the same scribe, is the Old French Sequence of Saint Eulalia.

The poem speaks of Louis in the present tense: it opens, "I know a king called Ludwig who willingly serves God. I know he will reward him for it". Since Louis died in August the next year, the poem must have been written within a year of the battle. However, in the manuscript, the poem is headed by the Latin rubric Rithmus teutonicus de piae memoriae Hluduico rege filio Hluduici aeq; regis ("German song to the beloved memory of King Louis, son of Louis, also king"), which means it must be a copy of an earlier text.

Synopsis
Dennis Green summarises the poem as follows:

After a general introductory formula in which the poet claims to know of King Ludwig (thereby implying the reliability of what he has to say) this king’s prehistory is briefly sketched: the loss of his father at an early age, his adoption by God for his upbringing, his enthronement by divine authority as ruler of the Franks, and the sharing of his kingdom with his brother Karlmann. [ll. 1–8]

After these succinct eight lines the narrative action starts with God’s testing of the young ruler in sending the Northmen across the sea to attack the Franks as a punishment for their sinfulness, who are thereby prompted to mend their ways by due penance. [ll. 9–18] The kingdom is in disarray not merely because of the Viking aggression, but more particularly because of Ludwig's absence, who is accordingly ordered by God to return and do battle. [ll. 19–26]

Raising his war-banner Ludwig returns to the Franks, who greet him with acclamation as one for whom they have long been waiting. Ludwig holds a council of war with his battle-companions, the powerful ones in his realm, and with the promise of reward encourages them to follow him into battle. [ll 27–41] He sets out, discovers the whereabouts of the enemy and, after a Christian battle-song, joins battle, which is described briefly, but in noticeably more stirring terms. Victory is won, not least thanks to Ludwig’s inborn bravery. [ll. 42-54]

The poem closes with thanks to God and the saints for having granted Ludwig victory in battle, with praise of the king himself and with a prayer for God to preserve him in grace. [ll. 55–59]

Genre
Although the poem is Christian in content, and the use of rhyme reflects Christian rather than pagan Germanic poetry, it is often assigned to the genre of Preislied, a song in praise of a warrior, of a type which is presumed to have been common in Germanic oral tradition. Not all scholars agree, however. Other Carolingian-era Latin encomia are known for King Pippin of Italy (796) and the Emperor Louis II (871), and the rhyming form may have been inspired by the same form in Otfrid of Weissenburg's Evangelienbuch (Gospel Book), finished before 871.

Language
The text is principally written in a Rhine Franconian variant of Old High German, though with certain other, possibly West Frankish, influences. The writer of the text is often assumed to have been a native Romance-speaker.

Notes

Bibliography

 Althochdeutsches Lesebuch, ed. W. Braune, K. Helm, E. A. Ebbinghaus, 17th ed., Tübingen 1994. . Includes the standard edition of the text. 
  Includes a translation  into English. Limited preview at Google Books

 

 

 

Wolf, Alois. "Medieval Heroic Traditions and Their Transitions from Orality to Literacy". In Vox Intexta: Orality and Textuality in the Middle Ages, ed. A. N. Doane and C. B. Pasternack, 67–88. Madison: University of Wisconsin Press, 1991. Limited preview at Google Books

External links
Le Rithmus teutonicus ou Ludwigslied - facsimile and bibliography from the Bibliothèque Municipale, Valenciennes (in French)
High quality facsimile of all four sheets  (Bibliotheca Augustana)
Transcription of the text (Bibliotheca Augustana)
OHG text from Wright's Old High German Primer (1888)
OHG text and modern German translation 
OHG text with modern French translation

Medieval German poems
Old High German literature
Military history of the Carolingian Empire